Camp Hill railway station refers to a series of disused railway stations in Camp Hill, Birmingham.

History
It was opened by the Birmingham and Gloucester Railway (B&GR) in 1840 and was its first terminus.

Subsequently, the line extended to join the London and Birmingham Railway to the latter's Curzon Street terminus. The former terminus was split into two: Camp Hill (passengers) and Camp Hill Goods, with the latter forming a spur. 

In 1854 Birmingham New Street opened and began to usurp Curzon Street as the main Birmingham station. From 1867 to 1904, it was known as Camp Hill and Balsall Heath. The name of the station reverted back to Camp Hill in 1904.

Because of the necessity for a reversal at New Street, many trains on the Midland Railway line from Derby continued to use Camp Hill until New Street was extended in 1885 and connected to the Birmingham West Suburban Railway (BWSR). This also resulted in the stretch from Kings Norton to Camp Hill becoming a branch line, being renamed the Camp Hill line after its eponymous former terminus.

The station and line closed to passenger traffic on 27 January 1941. Camp Hill Goods station continued operating until the 1960s, however it has since been turned into an industrial estate.

Station masters
Mr. Mewis c.1847—?
John F. Pepper 1859—1894
John Edward Hemmings 1895—?(formerly station master at Five Ways)
Mr. Avery ?—1936
E. Bosworth ?—1939
H.J. Turner 1939—1941(also station master at Brighton Road and Moseley)

Incidents 
On 26 June 1845, a B&GR passenger train from Gloucester, hauled  by one of the company's Philadelphia, United States-built engines, ran into a slow-moving "heavy, powerful" goods engine which was crossing the line from a siding, via a diamond crossing, at Camp Hill. The driver of the Gloucester train was badly hurt after jumping from his engine. Some passengers suffered minor injuries, mostly from flying glass. Both engines suffered only minor damage. The driver of the goods engine was deemed at fault, but was discharged by magistrates on the grounds of previous good character. For the same reason the company demoted him to non-driving duties, rather than dismissing him.

References

Disused railway stations in Birmingham, West Midlands
Railway stations in Great Britain opened in 1840
Former Midland Railway stations
Railway stations in Great Britain closed in 1941